Zlobice is a municipality and village in Kroměříž District in the Zlín Region of the Czech Republic. It has about 600 inhabitants.

Administrative parts
The village of Bojanovice is an administrative part of Zlobice.

History
The first written mention of Zlobice is from 1078.

References

Villages in Kroměříž District